Childhood (post-reform ) is the first published novel by Leo Tolstoy, released under the initials L. N. in the November 1852 issue of the popular Russian literary journal The Contemporary.

It is the first in a series of three novels, followed by Boyhood and Youth. Published when Tolstoy was just twenty-three years old, the book was an immediate success. It earned Tolstoy notice from other Russian novelists including Ivan Turgenev, who heralded the young Tolstoy as a major up-and-coming figure in Russian literature.

Childhood explores the inner life of a young boy, Nikolenka. It is one of the books in Russian writing to explore an expressionistic style, mixing fact, fiction, and emotions to render the moods and reactions of the narrator.

Excerpt
"Will the freshness, lightheartedness, the need for love, and strength of faith which you have in childhood ever return?  What better time than when the two best virtues -- innocent joy and the boundless desire for love -- were the only motives in life?"

See also

Leo Tolstoy bibliography

References

External links
 (transl. by C. J. Hogarth)
Full text of Childhood in the original Russian

1852 Russian novels
Novels by Leo Tolstoy
Russian autobiographical novels
Works originally published in Sovremennik
1852 debut novels